Lady Doctor is a 1967 Indian Malayalam film, directed by K. Sukumar and produced by P. Subramaniam. The film stars Madhu, Sheela, Muthukulam Raghavan Pillai and Vaikkam Mani in the lead roles. The film had musical score by V. Dakshinamoorthy.

Cast

Madhu as Johny
Sheela as Lilly
Muthukulam Raghavan Pillai as Mathai
Vaikkam Mani
Aranmula Ponnamma as Shoshamma
Joseph Chacko
Kottarakkara Sreedharan Nair
Pankajavalli as Eliyamma
Rajeshwari
S. P. Pillai as Thommi
K. V. Shanthi as Marykutty

Soundtrack
The music was composed by V. Dakshinamoorthy and the lyrics were written by P. Bhaskaran.

References

External links
 

1967 films
1960s Malayalam-language films